In enzymology, a phosphoramidate-hexose phosphotransferase is an enzyme that catalyzes the chemical reaction

phosphoramidate + hexose  NH3 + alpha-D-hexose 1-phosphate

Thus, the two substrates of this enzyme are phosphoramidate and hexose, whereas its two products are NH3 and alpha-D-hexose 1-phosphate.

This enzyme belongs to the family of transferases, specifically those transferring phosphorus-containing groups (phosphotransferases) with an alcohol group as acceptor.  The systematic name of this enzyme class is phosphoramidate:hexose 1-phosphotransferase. Other names in common use include phosphoramidate-hexose transphosphorylase, and phosphoramidic-hexose transphosphorylase.

References

 

EC 2.7.1
Enzymes of unknown structure